Peter Revers (born 1954) is a German-Austrian musicologist and university lecturer at the University of Music and Performing Arts Graz.

Life 
Born in Würzburg, Revers is the son of the psychologist . He studied musicology, psychology, philosophy and music composition at the Paris-Lodron-University and at the Mozarteum Salzburg and University of Vienna. He received his doctorate in 1980 and also received his artistic diploma in 1981. From 1981 to 1996 he was assistant, lecturer and guest professor at the Vienna and Graz Universities of Music, but also worked at the universities of Salzburg and Hamburg. In 1988/1989 he was granted a research fellowship by the Alexander von Humboldt Foundation of the University of Hamburg, where he also habilitated in 1993. Revers has been married to the pianist and university professor Lucy Revers-Chin since 1982.

Since 1996 Revers has been full professor for music history at the Kunstuniversität Graz. From 2001 to 2009 he was president of the Austrian Society for Musicology. Revers' research interests include Gustav Mahler, Jean Sibelius, Mozart, the music of the 18th to 21st centuries, but also the reception of East Asia in the history of western music.

Publication 
 Friedrich C. Heller/Peter Revers: Das Wiener Konzerthaus. Geschichte und Bedeutung, Vienna 1983. 
 Gustav Mahler – Untersuchungen zu den späten Sinfonien. Hamburg 1985.
 Das Fremde und das Vertraute. Studien zur musiktheoretischen und musikdra-matischen Ostasienrezeption (Beihefte zum Archiv für Musikwissenschaft XLI), Stuttgart 1997.
 Mahlers Lieder, Munich 2000 (Verlag C. H. Beck).
 Harry…Heinrich…Henri…Heine: Deutscher – Jude – Europäer, ed. by Dietmar Goltschnigg, Charlotte Grollegg-Edler and Peter Revers, Berlin (Erich Schmied) 2008.
 Gustav Mahler – Interpretationen seiner Werke, edited by Peter Revers and Oliver Korte, 2 volS., Laaber 2011.

References

External links 
 Peter Revers an der KUG
 Revers am Institut für Musikpädagogik der KUG
 Peter Revers on WorldCat

Austrian musicologists
20th-century German musicologists
21st-century German musicologists
Academic staff of the University of Graz
1954 births
Living people
Writers from Würzburg